Marta was a Georgian princess royal of the Bagrationi dynasty, and a wife of the Safavid Iranian king (shah) Abbas I (r. 1588–1629). She married Abbas I on 20 September 1604. The two divorced in c. 1614. 

Marta was a daughter of David I by his wife Ketevan, daughter of Ashotan I, Prince of Mukhrani.

References

Sources
 
 

16th-century people from Georgia (country)
17th-century people from Georgia (country)
Safavid queens consort
Iranian people of Georgian descent
Princesses from Georgia (country)
Bagrationi dynasty of the Kingdom of Kakheti
16th-century women from Georgia (country)
17th-century women from Georgia (country)
17th-century people of Safavid Iran
Wives of Abbas the Great
17th-century Iranian women